Party of Justice and Trust is a centre-right political party in Bosnia and Herzegovina formed on 13 April 2013 in Sarajevo. Its president is Živko Budimir, formerly member of the Croatian Party of Rights of Bosnia and Herzegovina and former president of the Federation of Bosnia and Herzegovina. The party has three members in the Parliament of the Federation of Bosnia and Herzegovina.

2013 establishments in Bosnia and Herzegovina
Conservative parties in Bosnia and Herzegovina
Political parties established in 2013
Political parties in Bosnia and Herzegovina
Social conservative parties